"Song for the Lonely" is a song by Australian rock band The Living End. It is the second single from their sixth studio album The Ending Is Just the Beginning Repeating. The song was released through the iTunes Store on 29 July 2011.

Track listing
All tracks written by Chris Cheney.

"Song for the Lonely" – 3:13
"Gasoline" – 2:53

References
 

2011 songs
The Living End songs
2011 singles
Songs written by Chris Cheney
Dew Process singles
Songs about loneliness